Godoli is a census town in Satara district in the Indian state of Maharashtra.

Demographics
 India census, Godoli had a population of 16,751. Males constitute 52% of the population and females 48%. Godoli has an average literacy rate of 83%, higher than the national average of 59.5%: male literacy is 85%, and female literacy is 81%. In Godoli, 11% of the population is under 6 years of age.

References

Cities and towns in Satara district